William Carter Jenkins (July 26, 1945 – February 17, 2019) was an American public health researcher and academic.
 
Jenkins worked as a statistician at the United States Public Health Service in the 1960s, and is best known for trying to halt the Tuskegee syphilis experiment in 1969. He spent the rest of his career fighting racism in the U.S. healthcare system, working for the Centers for Disease Control and Prevention (CDC) during the early days of the AIDS crisis, and overseeing the government benefits program for survivors of the Tuskegee Syphilis Study.

Life and career 

Jenkins graduated from historically black Morehouse College with a degree in mathematics in 1967, and he earned a master's in biostatistics from Georgetown University in 1974, a master's in public health from the university of North Carolina at Chapel Hill (UNC) in 1977, and a PhD in epidemiology from UNC in 1983.

He was one of the first cadre of African Americans recruited to the United States Public Health Service Commissioned Corps in the 1960s. In 1980 he joined the Division of Sexually Transmitted Diseases at the CDC, where he was a Supervisory Epidemiologist and manager of the Tuskegee Health Benefit Program.

He later taught in the Epidemiology department at the University of North Carolina at Chapel Hill, and at Morehouse College in Atlanta Georgia. He served as co-director of the UNC Minority Health Project.

Recognition 
Jenkins received the Hildrus Augustus Poindexter Award from the National Black Caucus of Health Workers of the American Public Health Association.

Further reading

References

Morehouse College alumni
Georgetown University Graduate School of Arts and Sciences alumni
UNC Gillings School of Global Public Health alumni
People from Mount Pleasant, South Carolina
1945 births
2019 deaths
Centers for Disease Control and Prevention people
United States Public Health Service personnel
American epidemiologists
African-American activists
African-American statisticians
University of North Carolina at Chapel Hill faculty
Morehouse College faculty
21st-century African-American people